Céchi (also spelled Séchi) is a town in south-eastern Ivory Coast. It is a sub-prefecture of Agboville Department in Agnéby-Tiassa Region, Lagunes District.

Céchi was a commune until March 2012, when it became one of 1126 communes nationwide that were abolished.

In 2021, the population of the sub-prefecture of Céchi was 25,967.

Villages
The 9 villages of the sub-prefecture of Céchi and their population in 2014 are:

References

Sub-prefectures of Agnéby-Tiassa
Former communes of Ivory Coast